Dr. Shahid Siddiqui is a Pakistani academic, educationist, researcher, and writer. He served as Vice-Chancellor of Allama Iqbal Open University, Islamabad from 2014 to 2018. He was succeeded as VC AIOU by Dr. Nasir Mahmood in October 2018. Currently, he is working as Dean of Social Sciences with the National University of Modern Languages, Islamabad.

Bibliography 
 Education Policies in Pakistan: Politics, Projections, and Practices. Oxford University Press, Karachi.
 
 Language, Gender, and Power: Politics of Representation and Hegemony. Karachi; Oxford University Press.
 
 Education, Inequalities, and Freedom: A Sociopolitical Critique.
 
 Adhe Adhooray Khawab, Lahore: Jahangir Books.
 
 Adh Pachadhay Sufnay, Sang-e-Meel Publications.
 
 Mausam e Kushrang, Sang-e-Meel Publications.
 
 Education Policies in Pakistan Politics, Projections, and Practices. (1st Ed.). Pakistan: Oxford University Press.
  Language, Gender, and Power The Politics of Representation and Hegemony in South Asia (1st ed.). Pakistan: Oxford University Press.
 Rethinking Education in Pakistan Perceptions, Practices and Possibilities". Paramount Books. Paramount.
 Siddiqui, Shahid (2018). Adhay Adhoray Khuab (1st ed.). Pakistan: Sang-e-Meel. . Retrieved 26 September 2019.
 Siddiqui, Shahid (2020). Zer-e-Asman (1st ed.). Pakistan: Sang-e-Meel. . Retrieved 20 January 2020.
 Farooq, U. & Siddiqui, S. (2012). E-tutoring in teacher development programs for English language teachers through distance education in Pakistan, KJLR (Kashmir Journal of Language Research), Vol.15(1).
 Siddiqui, S. (2011). Language Policies in Pakistan: A dilemma of linguistic choices. NUML Journal of Critical Inquiry, Vol. IX (2).

References 

Academic staff of Allama Iqbal Open University
Year of birth missing (living people)
Living people